The Iran Book News Agency (IBNA) is the first and only book news agency in Iran.

History 
The Iran Book News Agency was established in 2006 in order to report on news about published books. The activities in IBNA are supervised by the Iran Book House. In addition to publishing news, IBNA offers updated reports, interviews and analyses of various foundations and organizations working in different publication fields.

See also
 List of Iranian news agencies

References

External links
 Official website

News agencies based in Iran
2006 establishments in Iran
Iran Book House